Men's Greco-Roman 60 kilograms competition at the 2020 Summer Olympics in Tokyo, Japan, took place on 1–2 August 2021 at the Makuhari Messe in Mihama-ku.

This freestyle wrestling competition consists of a single-elimination tournament, with a repechage used to determine the winner of two bronze medals. The two finalists face off for gold and silver medals. Each wrestler who loses to one of the two finalists moves into the repechage, culminating in a pair of bronze medal matches featuring the semifinal losers each facing the remaining repechage opponent from their half of the bracket.

Schedule
All times are Japan Standard Time (UTC+09:00)

Results

Main bracket

Repechage

Final standing

References

External links
Draw 

Wrestling at the 2020 Summer Olympics
Men's events at the 2020 Summer Olympics